{{DISPLAYTITLE:C18H20INO4}}
The molecular formula C18H20INO4 (molar mass: 441.260 g/mol, exact mass: 441.0437 u) may refer to:

 25I-NB34MD (NB34MD-2C-I)
 25I-NBMD

Molecular formulas